Claire Cory (born September 11, 1998) is an American politician serving as a member of the North Dakota House of Representatives from the 42nd district. She assumed office on October 11, 2019, succeeding Jake Blum.

Early life and education 
Cory was born and raised in Grand Forks, North Dakota. She graduated from Grand Forks Central High School. Since 2017, she has been a political science student at the University of North Dakota.

Career 
In 2018, Cory worked as an intern for the North Dakota Republican Party and United States Senate. She also volunteered on Kevin Cramer's re-election campaign. She was also an election worker for Grand Forks County, North Dakota. Cory was selected to succeed Jake Blum in the North Dakota House of Representatives in October 2019.

In August 2021, Cory created a Change.org petition demanding that the University of North Dakota remove its policy on face masks.

References 

1998 births
Living people
People from Grand Forks, North Dakota
Politicians from Grand Forks, North Dakota
Republican Party members of the North Dakota House of Representatives
Women state legislators in North Dakota
21st-century American women